The Moraga School District is an elementary school district in Moraga, California.

The majority of Moraga is within this district.

Schools in the district include Joaquin Moraga Intermediate School, Camino Pablo Elementary School, Donald Rheem Elementary School, and Los Perales Elementary School.

Sex abuse cases
Four former students in the district have filed sex abuse charges against the district, for negligence, based on alleged incidents of abuse from the 1990s. The alleged abuser had since then committed suicide after being relieved of his position at the school.

See also
List of school districts in California

References

External links
 

School districts in Contra Costa County, California